Platyspira is a monotypic genus of East Asian sheet weavers containing the single species, Platyspira tanasevitchi. It was first described by Y. J. Song & S. Q. Li in 2009, and has only been found in China.

See also
 List of Linyphiidae species (I–P)

References

Linyphiidae
Monotypic Araneomorphae genera
Spiders of China